Miles Leroy Hineman (November 26, 1851 – August 1, 1930) was a member of the Wisconsin State Assembly.

Biography
Hineman was born on November 26, 1851, in Dunkirk, Wisconsin. In 1879, he married Elizabeth Ann Rowan. They had six children. Hineman died on August 1, 1930, in La Crosse, Wisconsin and was buried in Tomah, Wisconsin.

Career
Hineman was first elected to the Assembly in 1886 and later re-elected in 1916 and 1918. Additionally, he was a member of the Tomah Common Council and the Monroe County, Wisconsin Board. He was a Republican.

References

External links

People from Dunkirk, Wisconsin
People from Tomah, Wisconsin
County supervisors in Wisconsin
Wisconsin city council members
1851 births
1930 deaths
Burials in Wisconsin
Republican Party members of the Wisconsin State Assembly